The Vypin alcohol poisonings killed an estimated 77 people in 1982 in Vypin near Kochi in Indian state of Kerala. Hundreds of people, mostly fish workers and other labour people, drank spurious liquor supplied by several Government-licensed arrack shops. The tragedy occurred on the Onam day of 1982 and killed 77 people, blinded 63, crippled 15 and reduced nearly 650 families were to penury. When victims of this killer brew were hospitalized, doctors identified signs of methanol poisoning.

See also 
List of alcohol poisonings in India

References

Crime in Kerala
1982 crimes in India
Alcohol-related deaths in India
History of Kochi
History of Kerala (1947–present)
Alcohol in Kerala